Walther Wever may refer to:

Walther Wever (general) (1887–1936), Chief of the Luftwaffe
Walther Wever (pilot) (1923–1945), his son, German fighter pilot